This is a list of notable Canadian photojournalists. For photojournalists of other nationalities, see list of photojournalists.

 Louise Abbott (born 1950)

 M.J. Alexander (born 1961)
 Jay Bahadur (born 1984)
 Doug Ball (born 1953)
 Ken Bell (1914-2000)
 Amber Bracken (born 1984)
 Duncan Cameron (photographer) (1928-1985)
 Jock Carroll (1919-1995)
 William DeKay
 Robert Del Tredici (born 1938)
 Lawrence Earl (1915-2005)
 Kevin Frayer (born 1973)
 Dina Goldstein (born 1969)
 Lyn Hancock (born 1938)
 Tom Hanson (photojournalist) (1967-2009)
 Dan Hudson (born 1959)
 Zahra Kazemi (1948-2003)
 Frank Lennon (1927-2006)
 Rod MacIvor (born 1946)
 Peter Martin (photographer)
 Peter H. Martyn (journalist) (born 1948)
 Jo-Anne McArthur (born 1976)
 Sheila McKinnon (born 2000)

 Dilip Mehta (born 1952)
 Charles Montgomery (writer) (born 1968)
 Finbarr O'Reilly (born 1971)
 Ed Ou (born 1986)
 Lyle Owerko
 Louie Palu (born 1968)
 Bob Peterson (photographer) (born 1944)
 Conrad Poirier (1912-1968)
 Jonathan Savoie (born 1973)
 Lana Šlezić (born 1973)
 Boris Spremo (1935-2017)
 Jack Turner (photographer) (1889-1989)
 Paul Watson (journalist) (born 1959)

References 

Canadian photojournalists